Guillaume Levarlet (born 25 July 1985) is a French former road bicycle racer, who competed professionally between 2008 and 2018 for the , , ,  and  teams.

Major results

2005
 9th Liège–Bastogne–Liège U23
 10th La Côte Picarde
2006
 1st La Côte Picarde
 9th Overall Grand Prix de la Somme
 9th Boucle de l'Artois
2007
 1st Tour du Jura
 2nd Road race, National Under-23 Road Championships
 6th Overall Tour de l'Avenir
 7th Overall Tour de l'Ain
 7th Polynormande
 10th Tro-Bro Léon
2008
 7th Tour du Doubs
 7th Grand Prix de la Somme
 9th Tour de Vendée
2009
 3rd Tour du Doubs
 4th Boucles de l'Aulne
 5th Overall Paris–Corrèze
 10th Overall Route du Sud
2010
 2nd Overall Tour du Gévaudan Languedoc-Roussillon
1st Stage 1
 6th Eschborn–Frankfurt City Loop
 10th Tour du Doubs
2011
 1st Overall Tour du Gévaudan Languedoc-Roussillon
1st Stages 1 & 2
 5th Route Adélie
 5th Tour de Vendée
 8th Grand Prix de Wallonie
2012
 2nd Overall Vuelta a Castilla y León
 6th Les Boucles du Sud Ardèche
 6th Klasika Primavera
2013
 4th Tour du Doubs
 6th Overall Tour du Gévaudan
 6th Polynormande
 7th Overall Rhône-Alpes Isère Tour
 9th Overall Route du Sud
 10th Cholet-Pays de Loire
 10th Boucles de l'Aulne
 10th Grand Prix de la Somme
2014
 6th Paris–Troyes
 9th Tro-Bro Léon
 9th Paris–Tours
2016
 9th Overall La Méditerranéenne

Grand Tour general classification results timeline

References

External links

French male cyclists
1985 births
Living people
Sportspeople from Beauvais
Cyclists from Hauts-de-France